Nalo is a surname and a given name. Notable people with the name include: 

 Alfred Maseng Nalo, Vanuatuan politician
 Joe Nalo (born 1951), Papua New Guinean artist
 Nakap Nalo, Bharatiya Janata Party politician
 Nalo Hopkinson (born 1960), Canadian writer